I Medici is an opera in four acts composed by Ruggero Leoncavallo, with a libretto by the composer. Set in Renaissance Florence at the court of Lorenzo de' Medici, it was intended as the first part of a planned but unfinished trilogy called Crepusculum. The opera premiered on 6 November 1893 at the Teatro Dal Verme in Milan.

Background and performance history

I Medici was intended as the first part of a planned but unfinished trilogy called Crepusculum, with the second and third operas to be called Savonarola and I Borgia. The word "crepusculum" is Latin for "twilight", signaling the influence of Richard Wagner's tetralogy Der Ring des Nibelungen (whose fourth installment is called "Twilight of the Gods" (Götterdämmerung)). The remaining two operas were never completed. Leoncavallo sought to create an "epic poem" for the stage. However, one contemporary review of the premiere stated:
In I Medici we have a historical opera like those that have been made many times before and will be hence ... [but] we do not have either an epoch or a set of characters brought truthfully to life; we do not have, in a word, that human counterpart of Wagner's mythological trilogy at which Leoncavallo gazed. 

It premièred at the Teatro Dal Verme in Milan on 9 November 1893. It was not successful in its day and has never become part of the standard repertoire. However, it was revived at the Frankfurt Alte Oper in 1993 in a concert version conducted by Marcello Viotti (the opera's first performance in Germany) and was given a fully staged performance in March 2013 at the Theater Erfurt in Erfurt, Germany, conducted by Emmanuel Joel-Hornak.

Roles

Synopsis
The opera is set in Renaissance Italy and concerns intrigues centering on the Medici family, and the Pazzi conspiracy. Giuliano de' Medici loves Simonetta Cattanei, who tries to warn him of the conspiracy against his family. But she is killed by Montesecco, a murderer hired by Pope Sixtus V. Giuliano is killed by the conspirators, but Lorenzo de' Medici escapes with the help of the poet Poliziano. He then wins the support of the people, who lynch the conspirators.

Recordings
A recording of the opera was released in 2010 on Deutsche Grammophon featuring Plácido Domingo as Giuliano de' Medici, Carlos Álvarez as Lorenzo de' Medici, Vitaly Kovalkov as Francesco de' Pazzi, Daniela Dessì as Simonetta Cattanei (Simonetta Vespucci née Cattaneo ) and Renata Lamanda as Fioretta de' Gori. It was recorded in July 2007 at the Teatro Comunale Florence, with Alberto Veronesi conducting the Orchestra and Chorus of the Maggio Musicale Fiorentino .

Notes

See also
Medici (TV series)

References

External links
Complete libretto 

Operas
Operas by Ruggero Leoncavallo
Italian-language operas
1893 operas
Operas set in Italy
Operas set in the 15th century
Cultural depictions of Lorenzo de' Medici
Operas based on real people